Four Sisters Before the Wedding is a 2020 Filipino Family comedy-drama film directed by Mae Cruz-Alviar, produced by Star Cinema and SCX. It serves as both a prequel and a sequel to the 2013 film, Four Sisters and a Wedding. It premiered on December 11, 2020, via KTX, iWant TFC, Sky Cable PPV, Cignal PPV as well in SM Cinemas and CityMall Cinemas in select modified general community quarantine areas.

Premise
During the COVID-19 pandemic, the Salazar sisters in the present day have an online meeting because of CJ's affair with Nicole, until the topic changes to the siblings’ life in the past: the story on how the siblings caught their father Caloy having an affair with another  woman.

Cast

Main cast
 Charlie Dizon as Theodora Grace "Teddie" Salazar
 Alexa Ilacad as Roberta Olivia "Bobbie" Salazar
 Gillian Vicencio as Alexandra Camille "Alex" Salazar
 Belle Mariano as Gabriella Sophia "Gabbie" Salazar

 Supporting cast

Special Participation
Toni Gonzaga as Teddie Salazar-Teodoro
Bea Alonzo as Bobbie Salazar-Harris
Angel Locsin as Alex Salazar
Shaina Magdayao as Gabbie Salazar
Enchong Dee as CJ "Reb-Reb" Salazar
Freddie Webb as Grace's father (shown in the movie in a still picture with Grace's mother Ibiang)

Production
On February 27, 2020, Star Cinema announced that 2013 film movie "Four Sisters and a Wedding" will have a prequel.

On October 10, 2020, Ilacad posted a photo with co-stars on her Instagram page which the production began to shoot the film.

References

External links
 

2020 films
Philippine comedy-drama films
2020 comedy-drama films
Prequel films
Films directed by Mae Cruz-Alviar
Philippine prequel films